Dancersend Waterworks is a 4 hectare biological Site of Special Scientific Interest in Spencersgreen south of Aston Clinton in Buckinghamshire. It was formerly a private waterworks supplying the Rothschild Dancersend estate, and is now owned by Thames Water. It is in the Chilterns Area of Outstanding Natural Beauty. A cooling pond within the Thames Water site is a Grade II listed building.

The site is an area of artificial banks, basins and plateaux in a chalk valley bottom, which has an unusually wide variety of herbs, grasses and shrubs. There is a badger sett and a range of butterfly and bird species. Grassland areas are rich in orchids, and there is some scrub and woodland.

The site on Bottom Road has no public access.

References

Sites of Special Scientific Interest in Buckinghamshire